"Labour is not a commodity" is the principle expressed in the preamble to the International Labour Organization's founding documents. It expresses the view that people should not be treated like inanimate commodities, capital, another mere factor of production, or resources. Instead, people who work for a living should be treated as human beings and accorded dignity and respect. Paul O'Higgins attributes the phrase to John Kells Ingram, who used it in 1880 during a meeting in Dublin of the British Trades Union Congress.

Law 
 Clayton Act 1914, which gave trade unions in the United States the freedom from paying penalties from courts for organising and taking collective action
 Versailles Treaty, establishing the International Labour Organization, Article 427
 Declaration of Philadelphia 1944, reestablishing the ILO under the United Nations and reaffirming the first principle that labour is not a commodity

See also 
 Commodification of labour
 Fictitious commodities
 Labor theory of value
 Criticism of capitalism

References

External links 
 International Labour Organization, Declaration of Philadelphia (1944)

Human resource management
Labour movement
Labour law